GW-405,833 (L-768,242) is a drug that acts as a potent and selective partial agonist for the cannabinoid receptor subtype CB2, with an EC50 of 0.65 nM and selectivity of around 1200x for CB2 over CB1 receptors. Animal studies have shown it to possess antiinflammatory and anti-hyperalgesic effects at low doses, followed by ataxia and analgesic effects when the dose is increased. Selective CB2 agonist drugs such as GW-405,833 are hoped to be particularly useful in the treatment of allodynia and neuropathic pain for which current treatment options are often inadequate.

References 

Cannabinoids
Aminoalkylindoles
Benzoylindoles
4-Morpholinyl compunds
Phenol ethers
Chlorobenzenes
CB2 receptor agonists